Rigali is an Italian surname. It appears to have originated in the vicinity of Barga.

People
Notable people include:

 Alfred L. Rigali, American stage manager, managed the stage for the original production of Sex
 Donald J. Rigali, American consultant to the Columbia Accident Investigation Board
 Elia Rigali, recipient of Australia's Bravery Medal
 John E. Rigali, Italian-American sculptor, businessman and inventor
 John J. Rigali, American one-time Massachusetts State Deputy of the Knights of Columbus
 Justin Francis Rigali, American cardinal of the Roman Catholic Church
 Norbert J. Rigali, American priest of the Roman Catholic Church, member of the Society of Jesus, contributor to America
 Sandra Rigali, Italian printmaking artist, former student of Swietlan Kraczyna
 Sébastien Rigali, Belgian microbiologist and molecular biologist (researcher of the genus Streptomyces, particularly including Streptomyces lunaelactis)

Places
 A Rigali, a village near Barga, Lucca, Tuscany, Italy
 Rigali, a frazione of Gualdo Tadino, Perugia, Umbria, Italy

References

Italian-language surnames
Lists of people by surname